Deagon railway station is located on the Shorncliffe line in Queensland, Australia. It serves the Brisbane suburb of Deagon.

Services
Deagon station is served by all stops Shorncliffe line services from Shorncliffe to Roma Street, Cannon Hill, Manly and Cleveland

Services by platform

References

External links

Deagon station Queensland Rail
Deagon station Queensland's Railways on the Internet
[ Deagon station] TransLink travel information

Railway stations in Brisbane